Sofovich may refer to:
 Gerardo Sofovich (1937–2015), Argentine TV host, comic and screenwriter
 Hugo Sofovich (1939–2003), Argentine film director and screenwriter
 Manuel Sofovich (1900–1960), Argentine journalist